Monk's Gate is a hamlet in the civil parish of Nuthurst, in the Horsham District of West Sussex, England.

Hymn tune
Although it is a tiny settlement, its name is well known around the world as a popular hymn tune in 65 65 66 65 meter to the hymn To be a pilgrim.

When Ralph Vaughan Williams was commissioned at the start of the 20th century to edit a new hymnal as an alternative to Hymns Ancient and Modern, he set John Bunyan's hymn, in an adaptation by Percy Dearmer, to his own adaptation of the tune of an English folk song Valiant or Welcome Sailor which he had collected from Mrs Harriet Verrall of Monk's Gate. Mrs Verrall was also the source of a widely used tune for the carol "On Christmas night all Christians sing", with her version thereafter being called the Sussex Carol.

References

External links

Who would true valour see

Villages in West Sussex
Horsham District
Ralph Vaughan Williams